Windstar Cruises is a cruise line that operates a fleet of small luxury cruise ships. Its six yachts carry just 148 to 310 guests and cruise to 50 nations, calling at 150 ports throughout Europe, the South Pacific, the Caribbean, and Central America. In May 2014, Windstar added to its sailing yachts by adding the Star Pride power yacht, followed by Star Breeze and Star Legend in May 2015. The additional capacity opened up new itineraries such as voyages to Iceland, the Panama Canal, and Costa Rica and allowed Windstar Cruises to sail Tahiti year round.

History 
The line was established as Windstar Sail Cruises in 1984, and its first ship, the Wind Star was launched in 1986, and was followed by the Wind Song which was launched in 1987 and Wind Spirit which was launched in 1988. Two additional ships were ordered from the French "Sociéte Nouvelle des Ateliers et Chantiers du Havre" shipyard: the Wind Surf and the Wind Saga.

Purchase by Holland America Line 

Holland America Line (HAL) purchased 50% of Windstar Sail Cruises in 1987 and purchased the balance of the company in 1988. HAL became a subsidiary of Carnival Corporation & plc in 1989. The option to continue building the Wind Surf and the Wind Saga was passed up by HAL. With assistance from the French Government these two larger ships were built for Club Med as Club Med I and Club Med II, with HAL / Carnival retaining rights of first refusal for purchase. A few years later, HAL / Carnival planned to buy Club Med I and Club Med II with permission. However, Windstar cruises was unable to purchase Club Med I and Club Med II and rename them to Wind Surf and the Wind Saga because they had only enough money to purchase one ship. So in 1998, Windstar acquired the sail cruiser Club Med I from Club Med Cruises, and rechristened her to her original name Wind Surf.

Sale of Windstar to Xanterra Travel Collection  
In March 2007, Carnival sold Windstar to Ambassadors International for $100 million.

On April 1, 2011, Windstar's parent company Ambassadors International filed for Chapter 11 Bankruptcy. A bankruptcy court in Delaware held a two-day auction and Anschutz Corporation won Windstar Cruises with a bid of $39 million. Subsidiary Xanterra Travel Collection is now the parent company.

Recent history 
Star Pride entered service on May 5, 2014 with an inaugural cruise from Barcelona, after some upgrades. In May 2015, Windstar increased its fleet from four yachts to six with Star Breeze and Star Legend. Both yachts underwent a $17 million, three-week dry dock in Genoa, Italy, before a christening ceremony in May. In 2016, Star Pride underwent a renovation to refurbish public spaces, expand the outdoor seating of the Veranda restaurant and remodeled the AmphorA restaurant.

In June 2018, Star Legend became the largest cruise ship to ever travel through Seattle's Ballard Locks and the Lake Washington Ship Canal. The work is part of the company's $250 million USD 'Star Plus' initiative. The work will take place at Fincantieri's shipyard in Palermo, Italy.

In 2019, Windstar was named the Best Small Ship Cruise Line by AFAR readers and Condé Nast Traveler's Readers' Choice Awards. In October 2019, Windstar Cruises announced that it would begin offering cruises to Alaska in 2021.

Fleet 
The ships are relatively small, with the Wind Surf having a capacity for about 300 passengers, and the others about 150. Star Pride carries up to 212 passengers in 106 suites as well as sister ships Star Legend and Star Breeze.

The ships are registered in the Bahamas. Under this flag they are some of the few cruise ships in the world where passengers are still allowed on the bridge (though not when entering or leaving port). With a shallow draft of only , the ships can enter ports that are inaccessible to larger cruise liners. In some cases, passengers need to take smaller boats into port (such as to Lipari) when the ship is at anchor.

Current fleet

Former fleet

See also
List of large sailing vessels

References

External links

 

American companies established in 1984
Anschutz Corporation
Carnival Corporation & plc
Companies based in Seattle
Cruise lines
Hospitality companies of the United States
Transport companies established in 1984